Carolene Mays is the executive director of the White River State Park (WRSP) Development Commission. She was appointed by Governor Eric Holcomb having first been appointed in 2016 by Governor Mike Pence (later vice president). She is also co-host of Community Link on WISH-TV.

In 2010, Mays was appointed by Governor Mitch Daniels as a commissioner for the Indiana Utility Regulatory Commission (IURC) which regulates the utility industry. She was reappointed and named vice-chair in 2014 by Governor Mike Pence.

While at the IURC, she served on the board of directors for the National Association of Regulatory Utility Commissioners (NARUC); as president of Mid-America Regulatory Conference; and as chairperson of the Critical Infrastructure Committee. She also served on the Water and Washington Action Committees. She was named a 2013 Smart Grid Today Top 50 Smart Grid Pioneer for her leadership in cyber and physical security.

Mays was a finalist for an appointment by President Barack Obama as the Midwest Regional Director of Housing and Urban Development (HUD). She withdrew from consideration upon receiving the IURC appointment; later finding out she had been selected by the president.

Prior, she was president of the Indianapolis Recorder newspaper and Indiana Minority Business Magazine. Under her leadership, the Recorder emerged as one of nation's largest, most award winning newspapers in the National Newspaper Publishers Association. She purchased Indiana Minority Business Magazine and it became profitable under her management in the first year of ownership.

Mays was the producer and co-host of "Recorder On Air Report Television Show" on a cable network, and co-host of a television news segment, "Community Link", on Central Indiana's CBS affiliate. She left the position in 2008, but in 2018, she again began hosting Community Link, on WISH-TV.

Previously, at Mays Chemical Co. she was Manager of Marketing, Customer Service and National Accounts. She began her career at Occidental Chemical Co., Inc. where she held positions in sales and corporate account management, throughout the U.S.

Mays was elected to the Indiana Legislature in 2002; serving as State Representative for three terms. Nationally she served on the National Black Caucus of State Legislators, National Conference of State Legislators, and Women in Government. Mays had to retire from the State Legislature, November 2008 after making an unsuccessful bid for Congress.

Mays is a proud servant leader and is active in the community, currently serving on the Boards of: One America Financial Services, Heartland Church of Indianapolis, Cyber Leadership Alliance, Federal Bureau of Investigation (FBI) Citizens Academy, St. Vincent Hospital Foundation, IU Lilly School of Philanthropy Mays Institute as Vice-Chair, National Institute of Fitness and Sport, 2021 NBA All-Star Basketball Game, Leadership Indianapolis Stanley K. Lacy Executive Leadership Series, and 2022 College Football Playoffs, where she will also co-chair the event execution and game operations. She is a Lifetime board member of the Indiana Sports Corporation. She is also the President of the Indianapolis Chapter of the Links, Inc.

One of her recent business and community accomplishments was to moderate the 2017-2018 Stanley K. Lacy Executive Leadership Series, developing future leaders. She is the first and only African-American female leader to hold this position in its 43 year history.

Highlights of some previous boards include:  Julian Center for Domestic Violence, Indianapolis Neighborhood Housing Partnership, Capitol Improvement Board, University of Indianapolis, and Peyton Manning's Peyback Foundation.  Among her many past volunteer roles, she was Chairperson of three NCAA Women's Final Fours - in 2016, 2011 and 2005. She was the 2012 NFL Super Bowl Indianapolis Division Chairperson of Administration which included Office Operations and Human Resources, where she led the hiring of all personnel for the Super Bowl.

Among her many awards, Mays recently was named by the Center for Leadership Development as the Madam CJ Walker Outstanding Woman of the Year. She received a 2017 Community Leader and Servant Award from Martin University and the 2017 Girl Scouts Award of Courage. She was also honored with a Sagamore of the Wabash by former Governor Mike Pence.

She has been featured in Indianapolis Monthly magazine as one of  "Indy's Most Powerful" and twice honored by the Indianapolis Business Journal as one of "Indiana's Most Influential Women", including in 2019.  Her accomplishments were highlighted twice as the feature cover story of the Indianapolis Woman Magazine, as well as in Indiana Minority Business Magazine. She is honored in Ben Davis High School's Hall of Fame and as an Indiana State University Distinguished Alumni.

On the political front, Mays received many legislator of the year awards and was listed by Roll Call, a Washington D.C. publication, as a Rising Star in Indiana Politics. In bipartisan fashion, she is a Democrat, who has been appointed by three Republican governors.

Mays has a B.S. in business management from Indiana State University and is a currently a candidate for a Master of Jurisprudence from Indiana University McKinney School of Law. She is a 2017 graduate of the FBI Citizen's Academy. She is an active member and overseer of Heartland Church, Alpha Kappa Alpha sorority, Indianapolis chapter of The Links, and Northeasterners. She is married to Fred Medley and has a daughter, Jada and three step-sons, Frederick II, Niles and Chase.

Education
Indiana State University, B.S., 1985 with a major in business management and a minor in marketing
Ben Davis High School, Indianapolis, Indiana

Political
Indiana State Legislature – State Representative, November 2002 – November 2008
State Committees: Vice-Chairman – Small Business and Economic Development; Ways and Means; and Public Health
National Black Caucus of State Legislators: Health; and Vice Chair – Small Business
Indiana Black Legislative Caucus, Treasurer
National Caucus of State Legislators: Business and Commerce
Women in Government
National Association of Regulatory Utility Commissioners (NARUC) appointed as Chair of the Committee on Critical Infrastructure; and on the Washington Action and Water Committees

Current employment
State of Indiana, April 2016, Executive Director, White River State Park Development Commission appointed by Governor Mike Pence.  Reappointed by Governor Eric Holcomb

Previous employment
State of Indiana, February 2010 - April 2016, Commissioner, Indiana Utility Regulatory Commission, appointed by Governor Mitch Daniels in 2010. Reappointed by Governor Mike Pence in 2014 as Commissioner and named Vice-Chairman
Indianapolis Recorder Newspaper, 1998–2010, Publisher & President, also serving as President of Indianapolis Recorder Charities (a 501c3)
Indiana Minority Business Magazine, 2007–2010, Publisher & President
Recorder On Air Report (ROAR), 1998–2008, Host and Producer of the ROAR, a public affairs and community news television talk show, airing weekly on Central Indiana cable networks
Community Link, 2000–2008, Co-host of weekly television news segment on the local CBS affiliate disseminating news from the African-American and Hispanic communities to a broader audience
Mays Chemical Company, 1991–1998, Manager of Customer Service and National Accounts
Occidental Chemical Company, Inc., 1985–1991, Various positions in Sales and Corporate Account Management throughout the nation

Community service - boards of directors
2011 NCAA Women's Final Four, Chairperson
2012 NFL Super Bowl Committee, Division Chairperson
Indiana Sports Corporation Board, Vice-Chairman
Peyton Manning's PeyBack Foundation Board
Press Club of Indiana
Former Colts Player Tarik Glenn's D.R.E.A.M. Alive Foundation
Ivy Tech State College – President's Diversity Council
Capital Improvement Board, appointed by Mayor Greg Ballard

Organization affiliations
Heartland Church; Alpha Kappa Alpha sorority; Indianapolis chapter of The Links; N.A.A.C.P.

References

External links

 http://www.in.gov/iurc/2573.htm
 http://www.ibj.com/mays-named-to-indiana-utility-regulatory-commission/PARAMS/article/18161
 http://www.naruc.org/commissions.cfm?s=in
 http://indianalawblog.com/archives/2010/02/ind_govt_govern_24.html
 
 https://web.archive.org/web/20101123050551/http://indianapoliswoman.com/covergallery/02/oct.asp
 https://sites.google.com/site/icwtorchbearerawards/recipients/by-year/2005-recipients/carolene-mays

Democratic Party members of the Indiana House of Representatives
Living people
Politicians from Indianapolis
Women state legislators in Indiana
1961 births
21st-century American women